Haunted is a 2005 novel by Chuck Palahniuk. The plot is a frame story for a series of 23 short stories, most preceded by a free verse poem. Each story is followed by a chapter of the main narrative, is told by a character in main narrative, and ties back into the main story in some way. Typical of Palahniuk's work, the dominant motifs in Haunted are sexual deviance, sexual identity, desperation, social distastefulness, disease, murder, death, and existentialism.

The synopsis on the dustjacket describes Haunted as a satire of reality television, but according to Palahniuk, the novel is actually about "the battle for credibility" that has resulted from the ease with which one can publish through the use of modern technology.

The cover of the 2006 U.S. trade paperback reprint features a glow-in-the-dark image.

Plot summary

Each of the book's chapters contains three sections: a story chapter, which acts as a framing device for the otherwise unconnected short stories; a poem about a particular writer on the tour, its author being unspecified; and the short story written by that writer.

The main story centers on a group of seventeen individuals (all of whom go by nicknames based on the story they tell) who have decided to participate in a secret writers' retreat, frequently compared by characters to the Villa Diodati retreat of 1816. After having noticed an invitation to the retreat posted on the bulletin board of a cafe in Oregon, the characters follow instructions on the invitation to meet Mr. Whittier, the retreat's organizer. Whittier tells them to each wait for a bus to pick them up the next morning and bring only what they can fit into one piece of luggage (in particular, only what they feel they need most).

The next day, the seventeen characters, Whittier, and his assistant Mrs. Clark are driven to an abandoned theatre. Whittier locks all of them inside the theatre, telling them they have three months to each write a magnum opus before he will allow them to leave. In the meantime, they will have enough food and water to survive, as well as heat, electricity, bedrooms, bathrooms, and a clothes washing and drying machine provided.

The characters live under harmless conditions at first. However, the group (not including Whittier or Clark) eventually decide that they could make a better story of their own suffering inside the theatre, and thereby become rich after the public discovers their fate. They then begin to individually sabotage the food and utilities provided to them, with each character trying to only destroy one food or utility to slightly increase the drama of their stay. Since the characters are not co-ordinating their plans, they end up destroying all their food and utilities, forcing all of them to struggle to survive starvation, cold, and darkness.

With Whittier accidentally dying from a stomach rupture, the writers find themselves trapped without him. Believing a great increase in their suffering will provide a better story for when they're rescued, several writers start to willingly engage in self-mutilation and cannibalism, doing so to give the pretense Whittier tortured them. With numerous characters committing suicide, killing one another, or succumbing to their ailments, they continue to formulate their story whilst the theatre somehow repairs its broken utilities.

With numerous people dead, Mrs. Clark included, the writers continue to sabotage themselves, such as destroying the lighting and wasting any additional food supplies they find. The eleven remaining writers eventually group in the main theatre, only for Whittier to appear and reveal he faked his death (with Clark's help) and has been observing the writers through hidden cameras. Informing the writers their three months have passed and that they are free to leave, Whittier notes that, by continuing to blame him for everything and playing the victim to extreme extents, they haven't acted any differently from the other groups. Whittier unlocks the exit and leaves with Miss Sneezy, choosing her as the person he saves and offering her a new life. Mother Nature, objecting that they need to wait a little longer for other writers to die and for someone to rescue them, stabs Miss Sneezy. To prevent Whittier from leaving with her, they drag Miss Sneezy back inside and break the lock, and continue to wait for rescue.

Characters
The following are the 19 characters in the main narrative, along with the stories they tell:

"Guts"
The book is best known for the short story "Guts", which had been published before the book in the March 2004 issue of Playboy magazine as well as on Palahniuk's website. It is a tale of violent accidents involving masturbation, in which the reader is instructed to hold their breath in the very first line.

A New York City public school 11th grade teacher was suspended for letting his English class read "Guts".

Plot summary
"Guts" begins with the narrator, aptly named "Saint Gut-Free", telling the reader to hold their breath for the duration of the story.

The narrator then describes three stories of male masturbation gone horribly awry. In the first story, an adolescent boy inserts a Vaseline-lubricated carrot into his rectum to stimulate his prostate, then,  in haste, stashes it in a pile of laundry when he is called to dinner. Later, his mother takes the laundry away and presumably discovers the used carrot, but never mentions the incident. Next, the narrator tells the tale of a young boy who, having heard that it enhances masturbatory pleasure, inserts a thin stick of candle wax into his urethra. The wax unexpectedly slips back into the boy's bladder, thereby blocking his urine flow and causing blood to seep from his penis. Because he requires expensive surgery, his parents are forced to pay to repair his bladder with the boy's college savings. Finally, the narrator explains how he himself suffered a sexual injury, when sitting on the water-intake valve at the bottom of his home swimming pool while masturbating. While swimming down to the bottom of the pool to stimulate his prostate before coming up for air—a repetitive process he refers to as "pearl diving"—the suction from the valve causes his rectum and lower intestines to prolapse and become tangled in the filter. Ultimately, he finds himself stuck on the bottom of the pool and must gnaw through his own innards to free himself and avoid drowning. When Saint Gut-Free's sister later becomes pregnant, he falsely believes that he is the father of an incestuous child, since he thinks his sister has encountered the semen he leaves in their family swimming pool on that fateful day (she is actually pregnant by her boyfriend and decided to have an abortion).

In between the main stories, Saint Gut-Free muses over families who cover up their loved ones' accidental deaths by autoerotic asphyxiation. In doing so, he highlights the theme of sexual repression throughout the tale. For example, in all three cases of sexual trauma, the parents are aware of the erotic nature of their son's accidents, but never discuss them afterwards. As a result, their sons are forced figuratively  to "hold their breath" in the silence that lingers. Saint Gut-Free refers to these moments of sexual repression as the "invisible carrot," referring to both the mother in the first story and to the total denial of all the parents involved. At the end, the narrator tells the reader they can now take a breath, as he still has not taken one himself.

Purportedly all three of these incidents are based on true stories. According to Palahniuk, the first two tales came from his friends' experiences and the third he heard while shadowing sexual addiction support groups as research for Choke. In one of these groups, he met an extremely thin man. When Palahniuk asked him how he stayed so thin, he told him "I had a massive bowel resectioning." When Palahniuk asked what he meant, he told him the story which was the basis for the third episode in "Guts".

Reception 
Haunted received mixed to favorable reviews from critics upon its release. Haunted received a negative review from The New York Times columnist Tom Shone who noted that despite being referred to as a horror novel it is "...stubbornly unscary. It burps up its shock moments with so little ceremony that the Gothic virtue of stealthily sidewinding suspense -- the art of allowing a story to steal up on you before you even knew it was there -- is left whistling in the wind." Shone additionally noted the repetitive nature of many of the stories within the novel noting that every single story regardless of which character was narrating all utilized Palahniuk's distinctive style.

Tasha Robinson of The A.V. Club reviewed the novel soon after its release giving it a positive review, stating "...Palahniuk is as unique and colorful as ever, with his predilection for odd factoids and weird twists. But none of this makes the arbitrary deaths, the ludicrous behavior, or the pages upon pages about corpse-rot and vivisection any easier to deal with. Like his characters, Palahniuk sometimes seems to be operating under the presumption that he can never sink too low, or vomit up too much. Here's hoping he's wrong, for everyone's sake."

Editions
 (hardcover, 2005)
 (paperback, 2006)

References

External links

Official book website
Information about Haunted at ChuckPalahniuk.net
Haunted Has Director

2005 American novels
Metafictional novels
American horror novels
Novels by Chuck Palahniuk
Short story collections by Chuck Palahniuk
Doubleday (publisher) books
Self-harm in fiction
Novels about cannibalism
Books with cover art by Rodrigo Corral